Stan Whitmore (30 October 1936 – 15 December 2018) was an Australian rules footballer who played with Fitzroy in the Victorian Football League (VFL).

Notes

External links 

		

				
1936 births			
Australian rules footballers from Victoria (Australia)		
Fitzroy Football Club players
2018 deaths